The Net mansion is one of the Twenty-eight mansions of the Chinese constellations. It is one of the western mansions of the White Tiger.

Asterisms

References 

Chinese constellations